is an electro-mechanical arcade game that was released by Namco in 1978, and was licensed to Midway for US manufacturing and distribution in September 1979.

Gameplay
The player uses the yellow periscope to aim at the moving submarines on the screen. Pressing the button on the right handle will fire a torpedo, and the goal is to shoot down all of the submarines in the fastest amount of time. The farther the submarine is, the more points the player will receive, with green being the closest, and red being the farthest. The game ends when the timer on the cabinet reaches zero.

Reception and legacy
The November 11, 1978 issue of Cashbox called it ""one of the most realistic" games of its kind "ever put into a cabinet", while the December 30 issue noted of the game's realistic design and gameplay features.

In 1999, Namco demonstrated a sequel to Submarine, titled , at the Amusement Machine Operator's Union (AMOU) tradeshow in Tokyo. It was a video game that used a goggle-like controller that the player moved around to aim and fire in the game, and also featured periscope-esc stereo speakers. Submarines was designed to take full advantage of Namco's engineering technology, and was well-received by the press. Despite its praise, the game was never released.

Notes

References

Arcade games
Arcade-only video games
Namco arcade games
Submarine simulation video games
Video games developed in Japan